Loop 12 is a state highway that runs mostly within the city limits of Dallas, Texas. The western segment of the loop is named after General Walton Walker, who served and died in South Korea. During the 1950s and 1960s, Loop 12 was the outer beltway in the Dallas area, having since been supplanted by Interstate 635 (I-635), which is itself being supplanted by the President George Bush Turnpike (SH 190). Loop 12 is, however, the only state highway in Dallas that forms a complete loop (Belt Line Road is also a complete loop but is not a state road except for a stretch as part of Farm to Market Road 1382).

Route description
Starting in the east at I-30, Loop 12 goes north as Buckner Boulevard, following surface streets past White Rock Lake. Just north of White Rock Lake, it intersects Spur 244 and becomes Northwest Highway to the west; because there is an eastern and a western segment to this part of the road, at certain points the road signs read "East Northwest Highway". It continues west along surface streets over Central Expressway (U.S. Highway 75 (Texas), US 75) and the Dallas North Tollway and moves north of Bachman Lake and Dallas Love Field.

After crossing I-35E, Loop 12 moves south as a freeway, locally known as Walton Walker Boulevard, passing where Texas Stadium once sat at the interchanges with State Highway 114 (SH 114) and SH 183. The segment between I-35E (Stemmons Freeway) and Spur 408 is the only portion of Loop 12 that is freeway. It is also the only portion that leaves the Dallas city limits, as it runs through the eastern portion of Irving between where the road crosses the Elm Fork of the Trinity River (northern boundary, just north of the former site of Texas Stadium) and where it crosses the West Fork Trinity River (southern boundary). Loop 12 has TEXpress lanes (one in each direction) from State Highway 183 to I-35E TEXpress Lanes or I-35E which connects to the LBJ Express (I-635 TEXpress).

After intersecting I-30 for the second time, Loop 12 continues south, joining surface streets again east of Mountain Creek Lake at Mountain Creek Parkway and Patriot Parkway (or Spur 408, which provides a southwesterly freeway link to I-20). It continues to the southeast, turning east along Ledbetter Drive, just north of Dallas Executive Airport (formerly Red Bird Airport). It continues east, crossing US 67, I-35E for the second time, and I-45. At the intersection with US 175 and Murdock Road, Loop 12 turns north again as Buckner Boulevard all the way back to I-30. The portion between Bonnie View Rd. and US 175 is also known as Great Trinity Forest Way, as it passes across an undeveloped portion of the Trinity River and the Trinity River Audubon Center.

History
Loop 12 was designated on September 26, 1939, from US 175 across US 80 to the Buckner Orphans Home, and across US 67 to SH 114 at White Rock Lake as a renumbering of SH 40 Bypass. On April 23, 1942, Loop 12 was extended from US 175 to US 75. On August 3, 1943, Loop 12 was extended westward and northward to SH 183. On October 6, 1943, Loop 12 was extended northward and eastward back to SH 114 at White Rock Lake. On January 7, 1971, Loop 12 was rerouted on Spur 348 and part of the old location of SH 114; the rest of the old location of SH 114 became new Spur 348, and the old route of Loop 12 became Spur 482.

Major intersections

Gallery

See also

References

External links

012
Loop 012
Beltways in the United States
Transportation in Dallas County, Texas